Metapone is an Old World genus of ants in the subfamily Myrmicinae. The genus is found in the Indo-Australian, Oriental and Malagasy regions. Most species are known only from a few specimens.

Species

Metapone bakeri Wheeler, 1916
Metapone emersoni Gregg, 1958
Metapone gracilis Wheeler, 1935
Metapone greeni Forel, 1911
Metapone hewitti Wheeler, 1919
Metapone jacobsoni Crawley, 1924
Metapone johni Karavaiev, 1933
Metapone kanak Taylor, 2018
Metapone krombeini Smith, 1947
Metapone leae Wheeler, 1919
Metapone madagascarica Gregg, 1958
Metapone mjobergi Forel, 1915
Metapone murphyi Wang, Yamada & Eguchi, 2019
Metapone nicobarensis Tiwari & Jonathan, 1986
Metapone nivanuata Taylor, 2018
Metapone quadridentata Eguchi, 1998
Metapone sauteri Forel, 1912
Metapone tillyardi Wheeler, 1919
Metapone tricolor McAreavey, 1949
Metapone truki Smith, 1953
Metapone vincimus Alpert, 2007

References

External links

Myrmicinae
Ant genera